{{Speciesbox 
|image = Grevillea gariwerdensis.jpg
|image_caption = 
|genus = Grevillea
|species = gariwerdensis
|authority = Makinson
|synonyms_ref = 
|synonyms =
Grevillea linearifolia f. i' (Grampians form)Grevillea sp. aff. micrantha GrampiansGrevillea. sp. 1}}Grevillea gariwerdensis''' is a species of flowering plant in the family Proteaceae and is endemic to Grampians National Park in Victoria, Australia. It is a shrub with more or less linear to narrowly oblong leaves, and white to pink flowers with brownish hairs.

This grevillea is very similar in appearance to both Grevillea micrantha and Grevillea parviflora.

TaxonomyGrevillea gariwerdensis was first formally described in 2000 by Robert Owen Makinson in the Flora of Australia from specimens collected near Halls Gap by Alexander Clifford Beauglehole in 1966. The specific epithet (gariwerdensis) refers to the Gariwerd Range, also known as the Grampians Range in Grampians National Park, where this species is endemic.

Distribution and habitat
The species occurs on sandy soils in low moist heaths within Grampians National Park. 

Conservation status
Grevillea gariwerdensis is listed as "data deficient" on the Department of Sustainability and Environment's Advisory List of Rare Or Threatened Plants In Victoria''.

References

gariwerdensis
Flora of Victoria (Australia)
Proteales of Australia
Plants described in 2000
Taxa named by Robert Owen Makinson